The Canton of Macouba is a former canton in the Arrondissement of La Trinité on Martinique. It had 1,650 inhabitants (2012). It was disbanded in 2015. The canton comprised the communes of Macouba and Grand'Rivière.

References

Cantons of Martinique